Ashchykol is a salt lake group in the Kyzylorda and Turkistan regions, Kazakhstan.

Ashchykol is one of the main lakes of the Ashchykol Depression. It is dry most of the year and the plains around the lake are used as a seasonal grazing ground.

Geography
Ashchykol is located in an arid region dominated by the sor type salt flats of the lower Sarysu basin. It has very indented shores, forming a cluster of small lakes after the flood season that follows the melting of the snows, right before it goes completely dry. The Boktykaryn river has its mouth at the northern end, but its waters rarely reach Ashchykol. In years of sufficient rain the Chu river flows from the east into lake Akzhaykyn, located to the ESE. Both lake groups are part of the Important Bird Area "Lakes in the lower reaches of the Chu River".

The shores of Ashchykol are flat and sandy. The border between the Shieli District of Kyzylorda Region and Sozak District of Turkistan Region runs across the northern and eastern ends of the lake. There are no settlements near the lake.

Climate
Ashchykol lies in a region of strong winds. Dust storms are common in the area of the lake.

See also
List of lakes of Kazakhstan
List of fossiliferous stratigraphic units in Kazakhstan

References

External links

Chu-Talas, Kazakhstan

Lake groups of Kazakhstan
Kyzylorda Region
Turkistan Region
Important Bird Areas of Kazakhstan